Provincial Transport Service, often abbreviated to as PTS, is the civil service under Group A state service of Government of Uttar Pradesh responsible for formulation and administration of the rules, regulations and laws relating to road transport, and transport research, in order to increase the mobility and efficiency of the road transport system in the state.

Recruitment 
The recruitment to the service is made on the basis of an annual competitive examination conducted by Uttar Pradesh Public Service Commission. One-third of PTS quota is filled by promotion from its feeder service. PTS officers, regardless of their mode of entry, are appointed by the Governor of Uttar Pradesh.

Responsibilities of PTS officer 
The typical functions performed by a PTS officer are:
 Formulation of policies relating to regulation of road transport, legislation relating to road transport including aspects of road safety, environmental issues, automotive norms besides making arrangements for movement of vehicular traffic with neighbouring states.
 Licensing of drivers/conductors, registration of motor vehicles, control of motor vehicles through permits and dealing with special provisions relating to state transport undertakings, traffic regulation, insurance, liability, offences and penalties, etc.

Career progression 
After completing their training, a PTS officer generally serves as assistant regional transport officer in districts. There are two posts of ARTO in districts i.e. ARTO (Administration) and ARTO (Enforcement), however in big districts there can be two-four ARTO (Enforcement) but only one ARTO (Administration). After that, they get promoted as regional transport officer at divisional level (Ghaziabad being exception which is only a district), each division has two RTO i.e. RTO (Administration) and RTO (Enforcement). Later they get further promotion as Deputy Transport Commissioners (Dy. TC) and are posted either in six transport zones or at commissionerate of transport. Subsequently they get promoted as additional transport commissioners (Addl. TC) either at field (west, east and central) or at commissionerate of transport. There is one Special Secretary post reserved for PTS officer in Transport Department.

Salary structure

See also 
 Provincial Civil Service (Uttar Pradesh)
 Provincial Forest Service (Uttar Pradesh)
 Provincial Police Service (Uttar Pradesh)
 Provincial Finance and Accounts Service (Uttar Pradesh)
 Provincial Rural Development Service (Uttar Pradesh)
 Provincial Secretariat Service (Uttar Pradesh)

References

External links 

Civil Services of Uttar Pradesh
1989 establishments in Uttar Pradesh